Travis Norton (born 12 April 1976 in Redcliffe, Queensland) is an Australian former professional rugby league footballer who played in the 1990s and 2000s. A Queensland State of Origin representative lock forward, he played his club football with the South Queensland Crushers, Canterbury-Bankstown and the North Queensland Cowboys, whom he captained to the 2005 NRL Grand Final.

Background
Norton played his junior rugby league for the Moranbah Miners.

Playing career
Norton made his first grade debut for South Queensland against the Canberra Raiders in round 1 of the 1995 ARL season at Lang Park.  Norton departed South Queensland at the end of 1996 after the club finished with the Wooden Spoon.

In 1997, Norton joined Canterbury who had aligned themselves with the rival Super League competition.  In the 1998 NRL season, Norton played 29 games as Canterbury finished 9th on the table and qualified for the finals.  Canterbury proceeded to make the 1998 NRL Grand Final after winning 4 sudden death elimination matches in a row including the club's famous preliminary final victory over rivals Parramatta which is considered to be one of the greatest comebacks of all time.  After being 18-2 down with less than 10 minutes remaining, Canterbury scored 3 tries to take the game into extra-time before winning the match 32–20.

The following week, he played at lock forward for Canterbury in their loss at the 1998 NRL grand final to the Brisbane Broncos.  Norton played with Canterbury until the end of 2003, he then signed with North Queensland.

Norton had captained the NRL's North Queensland Cowboys since 2004, and played for them in the 2005 NRL grand final loss to Wests Tigers. He was joined at the Cowboys by fellow Bulldogs teammate Johnathan Thurston in 2005.

Unfortunately for Norton, he retired on a very low note in 2006 with the Cowboys missing out on qualifying for the finals series.

References

External links 

1976 births
Living people
Australian rugby league players
North Queensland Cowboys players
Canterbury-Bankstown Bulldogs players
People from South East Queensland
Queensland Rugby League State of Origin players
Rugby league locks
Rugby league five-eighths
Rugby league players from Queensland
South Queensland Crushers players